An ASP.NET HTTP handler  is a process that runs in response to a request made to an ASP.NET Web application. The most common handler is the ASP.NET page handler that processes .aspx files. When users request an .aspx file, the request is processed by the page through the page handler.

HTTP handlers were not present in the "Classic" ASP.  They implement the System.Web.IHttpHandler interface. Unlike ASP.NET Web Forms, they have no HTML-markup file, no events and other supporting. All they have is a code-file (written in any .NET-compatible language) that writes some data to the server HTTP response. HTTP handlers are similar to ISAPI extensions.

An HTTP module is an assembly that is called on every request that is made to your application. HTTP modules are called as part of the ASP.NET request pipeline and have access to life-cycle events throughout the request. HTTP modules let you examine incoming and outgoing requests and take action based on the request.

Unlike ASP.NET Web Forms, that have ".aspx" file extension, ASP.NET handlers by default have ".ashx" file extension.

Handlers are considered to be more lightweight object than ASP.NET Web Forms. That is why they are used to serve dynamically-generated images, on-the-fly generated PDF-files and similar content to the web browser.

With ASP.NET Core, this HTTP handlers have been replaced with "middleware" ApplicationBuilders (IApplicationBuilder) which allow routing requests based on request headers instead of just the URL path.

See also
Open Web Interface for .NET

References

External links
HTTP Handlers and HTTP Modules Overview at MSDN
IHttpHandlers at MSDN

ASP.NET